Kufra is a basin and oasis group in the Kufra District of southeastern Cyrenaica in Libya. At the end of nineteenth century Kufra became the centre and holy place of the Senussi order. It also played a minor role in the Western Desert Campaign of World War II.

It is located in a particularly isolated area, not only because it is in the middle of the Sahara Desert but also because it is surrounded on three sides by depressions which make it dominate the passage in east-west land traffic across the desert. For the colonial Italians, it was also important as a station on the north-south air route to Italian East Africa. These factors, along with Kufra's dominance of the southeastern Cyrenaica region of Libya, highlight the strategic importance of the oasis and why it was a point of conflict during World War II.

Etymology
The folk etymology associaters the word Kufra as coming from the Arabic word kafir, the Arabic term for non-Muslims (often translated as "infidels", literally "those who conceal [the truth]"),  with reference to the Toubou people native to the region.

Geography
Kufra is an elliptic shaped basin, oriented northeast-southwest. It is bordered by hills which are at most 100 m high. The soil consists of red marl or sand and in the lowest parts there are salt lakes or dried salines.
In the basin lie the following oases:
It is rich with palms and gardens.
 Buma and Buema, both small and situated to the east of Al Jawf. Gerhard Rohlfs set his camp north of Buema, and since then the locality is known as "Garet-en-Nasrani" ("Field of the Christian" in Arabic). Kufra Airport is located in Buma.
It consists of a line of Palm trees. Until the Italian occupation it was inhabited only by slaves.
Et-Tleilíb and Et-Talláb, both situated to the southwest of Al Jawf.

On the north edge of the basin, there is the village of El Tag, which means crown in Arabic, which does not contain an oasis. It was founded by Sayyid Muhammad al-Mahdi as-Senussi, the son of the founder of the Senussi order, when he moved to Kufra and is considered the holy place of Senussi.

Climate
Kufra has a hot desert climate (Köppen climate classification: BWh).

History

Early history 

Claudius Ptolemy wrote that around 90 AD Julius Maternus (or Matiernus) carried out a mainly commercial expedition. From the Sirte gulf he reached the Oasis of Cufra and the Oasis of Archei, then arrived, after 4 months travelling with the king of the Garamantes, to the river Bahr Salamat and Bahr Aouk, near modern-day Central African Republic in a region then called Agisymba.

In 1154 al-Idrisi described a place identified by Lewicki as the oasis of Kufra. Al Idrisi writes that the place was once flourishing and peopled, but was by that point in ruin, its wells dry, its herds returned to the wild. In the late 15th century, Leo Africanus reported an oasis in the land of the Berdoa, visited by a caravan coming from Awjila. It is possible that this oasis was identical with either the Al Jawf or the Tazirbu oasis, and on early modern maps, the Al Kufra region was often labelled as Berdoa based on this report. Berdoa possibly corresponded to the Toubou, a Nilo-Saharan speaking tribal people indigenous to the region. Kufra did not fall under the dominion of either the Arabs or the Ottomans and was part of a Toubou Sultanate with capital in Tazirbu. In the 1840s, the Toubou were colonized by the Arabized Berber tribe of Zuwayya and eventually by the Italians in the 1930s.

Early Western contact and the Senussi

The territory of Kufra was first explored by Westerners beginning with the 1873/74 expedition by German Gerhard Rohlfs. Rohlfs reportedly first reached the oasis from the north in 1879.

Kufra was an important trade and travelling route for various nomadic desert people. In 1895 the Ottomans forced the Senussi to leave Jaghbub, making the oasis their main centre. After that, Westerners could no longer visit it until the First World War, when several soldiers of the Entente were held prisoner there.

In 1931, during the campaign of Cyrenaica, General Rodolfo Graziani easily conquered Kufra, considered a strategic region, leading about 3,000 soldiers from infantry and artillery, supported by about twenty bombers.

Many refugees fled the Italian conquest eastwards via Uweinat into Egypt. The British explorer Pat Clayton, engaged in mapping areas of previously unmapped desert, encountered the Kufra refugees when running triangulation from Wadi Halfa to Uweinat, and helped save many from death in the arid desert.

Italian takeover of Kufra
The Frankfurter Zeitung reporter and author Muhammad Asad interviewed a man from Kufra after its seizure by the Italians in his book The Road to Mecca. According to Asad's source, the Italians attacked from three sides, with armored cars, artillery, and aircraft. The defenders, a few hundred men with only small arms unable to penetrate the Italian armor, defended the place house-to-house but were overwhelmed. The Italians (and their Eritrean auxiliaries) then raped the women, tore up a Koran and cast it on the ground, cut down the palm trees, burnt Sayyid Ahmad's library, and took some of the elders and scholars and hurled them to their death from airplanes.

Italian rule and World War II

In the following years the Italians built an airfield (now Kufra Airport) in Buma oasis and a fort in El Tag, which dominated the area.

Buma airport was equipped with a radio-centre for flight assistance and was often used as a stop for routes toward Asmara and Italian East Africa. The fort was also used as a radio post to guide in Italian aircraft as well as to maintain communication with Italian East Africa.

Kufra increased its importance when the Second World War started and, after the Suez Canal was closed to Italian shipping, connections with Italian East Africa became mainly aerial, using Kufra and its strategic location.

Kufra, thanks to its key role for the Italian Royal Army, soon became a target for the Allies, with Free France and British desert troops beginning a long battle for its conquest. On 31 January 1941 Pat Clayton, an explorer recruited by British Intelligence, was captured by the Italian Auto-Saharan Company near Jebel Sherif, when leading "T" Patrol in reconnaissance of the planned attack on Kufra.

The Free French from Chad, with General Leclerc leading a combined force of Free French and Chad native troops, attacked and took Kufra in the Battle of Kufra.

In later stages of the Western Desert Campaign, Kufra was used as a staging post for Allied units such as the Long Range Desert Group and the Special Air Service.

In May 1942 it was a location of the Tragedy at Kufra, where three South African Air Force Bristol Blenheim aircraft became lost and after landing safely the crews subsequently died due to lack of water.

After the war 

After the Axis were expelled from North Africa, and when after the war it became part of independent Libya, the Buma airfield at Kufra has fallen into disrepair and is little-used. The town surrounding the Oasis is still dominated by the old fort of El Tag, built by the Italians in the mid-1930s.

On 26 August 2008, a hijacked Sudanese Boeing 737 landed at Kufra Airport after having departed from Nyala Airport, Darfur, with destination Khartoum. Earlier, Egyptian authorities had refused to allow the plane to land in their national capital, Cairo.

In recent decades, Kufra has become a major point on the route of African migrants who try to reach Europe by various routes, and some of whom get incarcerated in Kufra's notorious prison.

During the 2011 Libyan Civil War, the area was reported to be under control of anti-Gaddafi forces and not the government of Muammar Gaddafi on 2 April 2011. On 28 April 2011, loyalist forces reportedly re-captured Kufra. There were no reports of casualties in the fighting for the town after the rebels put up only light resistance. By 6 May 2011 the town had been retaken by the Libyan rebels. In February 2012, fighting between the Tobu and Zuwayya tribes killed over a hundred people and the town became a focal point for mass human rights violations of refugees and migrants.

Tourism
Kufra is situated in the middle of the Sahara for its pristine desert beauty, so that tours to the oasis are organized by local tour operators.

Kufra in migrants' routes and human trafficking
Migrants coming from the East African coast and the Near East pass through and compulsorily stop in Kufra. It is a little village of transit along the traditional route between Khartoum and the coastal Libyan towns, which has lately turned to be a spot gathering Libyan-Sudanese criminal organizations involved in the illegal transport of immigrants, police officers controlling the boundaries and the need of people working in local productive activities.

The village of Kufra has long been suspected and accused by European Parliamentary delegations as being criminally instrumental in assisting migrants. In 2007, they defined Kufra as "a free zone, a sort of starting Centre of Temporary Permanence CPT against the law... These gathering centres are places, in which the first contacts with the criminal organizations occur. Such organizations promote the "journey of hope", with a flexible handling of the Migrants' African routes according to the restriction policies adopted by the various governments. The minds of the criminal organizations act accordingly to what happens in each country: if Morocco stresses its restrain policies, the routes move towards the Canary Islands, if the controls in Libya increase, the streams are diverted towards Malta. When the migratory stream is over, the routes are back on Libya and Tunisia."

The  route towards the coastal Libyan towns is done at night on covered trucks. Such journey conditions are described as "hellish". People are often stopped by the police and therefore the route is covered many times in both directions. Once the migrants arrive, or are brought back, in Kufra, the only way to escape this situation is to pay people traders, which are often colluded with the police officers. People brought back to the Sudanese border may reverse the course just with cash money. Hence the occurrence of  continuous exploitation, enlistment in the work and prostitution black market, painful waiting for a money order urged by relatives and friends through mobile phone communications, which are allowed only for this aim.

In 2005 Italy allocated funds for the creation of a detention camp at Kufra.

Inhuman conditions of detention 

Kufra jail is defined by Ethiopian and Eritrean migrants, who stayed there, as:

Agricultural project

At the beginning of the 1970s, Libya launched a great cultivation project in Kufra aimed at developing agriculture in the desert. LEPA irrigation is provided by fossil water beneath the ground surface, the Nubian Sandstone Aquifer System, a non-renewable source and the only accessible water resource in the area. Rotors (high sprinkler that rotates) provide irrigation and the obtained circles have a diameter of about 1 km and can be observed from space.

This is one of Libya's largest agricultural projects. Because only about two percent of Libya's land receives enough rainfall to be cultivated, this project uses the underground aquifer. The green circles in the desert frequently indicate tracts of agriculture supported by center-pivot irrigation. The agricultural project is an easy-to-recognize landmark for orbiting astronauts aboard the International Space Station. The Libyan government also has a project called the Great Manmade River to pump and transport these groundwater reserves to the coast to support Libya's growing population and industrial development. As of December 2011, the excessive exploitation of the aquifer has provoked the complete drying up of the lake in the oasis.

References

Sources

External links
 Information about the Battle for Kufra
 (DE) Kufra Project
 (DE) Green Desert, Kufra Project

Populated places in Kufra District
Oases of Libya
Cyrenaica
Protected areas of Libya
Baladiyat of Libya